Korea is a region in East Asia.

Korea may also refer to:
 North Korea, officially the Democratic People's Republic of Korea
 South Korea, officially the Republic of Korea

Places

Historical

Goguryeo or Koguryŏ, an ancient Korean kingdom whose name changed to Koryŏ in the 5th century; "Korea" comes from "Koguryŏ" (37 BC–668 AD)
Goryeo or Koryŏ, a medieval Korean kingdom (918–1392)
Joseon (1392–1897)
The Proto–Three Kingdoms period
The Three Kingdoms period
The Later Three Kingdoms period
The Korean Empire (1897–1910)
The People's Republic of Korea (1945–1946)

Geographical
Korea, Otwock County, part of Sobienie Szlacheckie, east-central Poland
Korea, Gmina Telatyn, Lublin Voivodeship, Poland
Korea, Gmina Ulhówek, Lublin Voivodeship, Poland
Korea District, Chhattisgarh, India
Korea State, India

Korea, Kentucky, United States
Korea, Virginia, United States

Films
Korea (1952 film), a lost Philippine film
Korea (1995 film), an Irish film directed by Cathal Black
As One (film), also known as Korea, 2012 South Korean film

See also
Korean (disambiguation), anything of, from, or related to the nations in the Korean peninsula
Names of Korea

Chorea (disambiguation)
Corea (disambiguation), an alternate spelling of Korea, in many languages other than English, also an alternate spelling of the surname Correa
Correa (disambiguation)
Correia, a Portuguese surname